Mieum is a thin, strained gruel made from white rice, white glutinous rice, foxtail millet, or glutinous foxtail millet. It is often used in liquid diet for patients and for recently weaned children. A thinner mieum, made from rice water or mixed with powdered milk, is sometimes used as a breast milk substitute for younger babies.

Preparation and varieties 
Rice or foxtail millet is soaked for at least 2 hours before being drained and boiled, usually at a ratio of 1 part grain to 10 parts water (1:10). It is simmered until sodden and mushy, then strained through a double sieve. The Sieved gruel is then warmed again and served with two small dishes of salt and cheongjang (clear soup soy sauce).

Sok-mieum 
Sok-mieum is a mieum made with jujube, chestnut, and ginseng. Thinly sliced ginseng is simmered for an hour, and the water is used to make sok-mieum. Glutinous rice or glutinous foxtail millet, jujube, and chestnut is prepared in the same way: Boiling until mushy and double sieving. Glutinous rice-based sok-mieum is seasoned with sugar, while glutinous foxtail millet-based sok-mieum is seasoned with salt before being served.

See also 
 Juk – Korean porridges
 Eungi – Korean grain starch porridges
 Congee – Asian rice porridges
 List of porridges

References 

Korean rice dishes
Porridges
Rice drinks